Adele DeGarde (born Adelaide De Gard, also credited Adele De Garde; May 3, 1899 – November 1972) was an American silent film actress, who performed in at least 114 productions between 1908 and 1918. A native of Brooklyn, New York, she initially worked in uncredited parts under the direction of D. W. Griffith at Biograph Studios in Manhattan and later became a screen star for Vitagraph Studios, often specializing in ingénue roles.

Career

In 1908, when pictures were looked at with a bit of apprehension, DeGarde (at the age of eight) began to appear in Vitagraph Studios. And DeGarde and her little pal, Kenneth Casey, were the mischievous, spoiled, or ill-treated children around whom centered many a melodramatic plot. As new stars joined the Vitagraph forces, DeGarde and Kenneth played with them. Many a picture of the "two-generation" or "from-child-to-woman" type would open with DeGarde as its child heroine and finish with Leah Baird, Edith Storey, or Dorothy Kelly rounding out the plot when the child had grown up.

As the years grew, so did DeGarde, until finally she grew too large for little-girl-before-growing-up parts, and, with many sighs, her directors were forced to "pass her up" and cast anxious glances around for another promising child. Loath to part with their two clever little players, the company produced some exceedingly funny pictures enacted entirely by children about fourteen or fifteen. These comedies proved extremely popular, because they were so typical of children at that age.

When Vitagraph was casting Within the Law, they were a trifle at a loss as to whom they should give the part of Aggie Lynch, a character on whom all the comedy relief of the play was dependent. After a careful study of the part, it was determined that DeGarde should have it. Press critics had nothing but lavish praise for her performance as Lynch and pronounced it "a huge success".

In 1939, she attended an Old Home Week at Ohrbach's in New York with other movie actors such as Mae Murray and June Elvidge.

Reviews for Within the Law
Variety: "Adele DeGarde as Aggie Lynch, which in reality is nothing more than a comedy foil for the lead, had something on the star, judging from the impression she left on the minds of the audience."
Moving Picture World: "Adele DeGarde as Aggie Lynch must be credited with one of the best performances in the picture. In a character easy to overplay she strikes just the right note, and her amusing unmorality is always without offense."

Filmography

The Christmas Burglars (1908)
One Touch of Nature (1909)
The Golden Louis (1909)
The Roue's Heart (1909)
The Salvation Army Lass (1909)
The Lure of the Gown (1909)
The Terrible Quarrel (1909)
The Voice of the Violin (1909)
The Deception (1909)
And a Little Child Shall Lead Them (1909)
A Burglar's Mistake (1909)
The Medicine Bottle (1909)
A Drunkard's Reformation (1909)
Twin Brothers (1909)
Tis an Ill Wind That Blows No Good (1909)
What Drink Did (1909)
The Lonely Villa (1909)
The Country Doctor (1909)
The Children's Friend (1909)
A Fair Exchange (1909)
Leather Stocking (1909)
Wanted, a Child (1909)
Pippa Passes; or, The Song of Conscience (1909)
What's Your Hurry? (1909)
The Open Gate (1909)
In the Window Recess (1909)
The Death Disc: A Story of the Cromwellian Period (1909)
Through the Breakers (1909)
In a Hempen Bag (1909)
In Little Italy (1909)
The Rocky Road (1910)
The Last Deal (1910)
One Night and Then (1910)
Over the Garden Wall (1910)
A Life for a Life (1910)
The Adventures of Dolly and Jim
Little Angels of Luck (1910)
A Mohawk's Way (1910)
In Life's Cycle (1910)
Examination Day at School (1910)
The Iconoclast (1910)
The Children's Revolt (1910)
Jean Goes Fishing (1910)
A Tin-Type Romance (1910)
Jean and the Waif (1910)
His Trust (1911)
His Trust Fulfilled (1911)
Society and the Man (1911)
St. Valentine's Day in Greenaway Land (1911)
Teaching Dad to Like Her (1911)
Billy's Valentine (1911)
The Derelict Reporter (1911)
The Children of Social Favorites (1911)
Sunshine and Shadow (1911)
Barriers Burned Away (1911)

A Geranium (1911)
The Long Skirt (1911)
Cherry Blossoms (1911)
The Child Crusoes (1911)
An Answered Prayer (1911)
Carr's Regeneration (1911)
By Way of Mrs. Browning (1911)
The Trail of Books (1911)
Suffer Little Children (1911)
The Miser's Heart (1911)
The Voiceless Message (1911)
Saving the Special (1911)
The Voice of the Child (1911)
A Doubly Desired Orphan (1911)
The Chocolate Revolver (1912)
The Five Senses (1912)
The Black Wall (1912)
The Old Silver Watch (1912)
The Governor Who Had a Heart (1912)
The Old Kent Road (1912)
The Man Under the Bed (1912)
The Light that Failed (1912)
Ingenuity (1912)
Vultures and Doves (1912)
The Mills of the Gods (1912)
Three Girls and a Man (1912)
The Eavesdropper (1912)
Thou Shalt Not Kill (1913)
When Bobby Forgot (1913)
A Birthday Gift (1913)
Dick, the Dead Shot (1913)
The Only Veteran in Town (1913)
The Widower's Quest (1913)
 The Lion's Bride (1913)
Buddy's Downfall (1914)
Buddy's First Call (1914)
Mr. Barnes of New York (1914)
A Pillar of Flame (1915)
Insuring Cutey (1915)
Rags and the Girl (1915)
The Ruling Power (1915)
Saints and Sinners (1915)
Green Stockings (1916)
Tubby Turns the Tables (1916)
Myrtle the Manicurist (1916)
Lights of New York (1916)
Help! Help! Help! (1916)
Whistling Dick's Christmas Stocking (1917)
Within the Law (1917)
The Love Doctor (1917)
The Bottom of the Well (1917)
The Purple Dress (1918)
The Rathskeller and the Rose (1918)
The Triumph of the Weak (1918)
The Enchanted Profile (1918)

References

External links

 
Adele De Garde: A Brief Biography at Welcome to Silent Movies

1899 births
1972 deaths
American silent film actresses
American child actresses
American film actresses
People from Brooklyn
Actresses from New York City
20th-century American actresses